Makkaliralavva Mane Thumba is a 1984 Kannada-language drama film directed by T. S. Nagabharana and written by Shankar Nag and Somu. The film had an ensemble cast including Anant Nag, Shankar Nag, Lakshmi and Gayathri.

The film, produced by Durga Dattha Enterprises, had original score and songs composed by G. K. Venkatesh.

Cast 

 Anant Nag 
 Shankar Nag
 Lakshmi as Rani
 Gayathri
 Ramesh Bhat
 Balakrishna 
 Master Manjunath
 Uma Shivakumar
 Sudheer
 Mandeep Roy
 Dinesh
 Master Kishan Kallianpur
 Master Santhosh
 Baby Meera
 Baby Mamatha

Soundtrack 
The music was composed by G. K. Venkatesh, with lyrics by Purandara Dasa and Doddarange Gowda.

References

External links 
 
 Know your films

1984 films
1980s Kannada-language films
Indian drama films
Films scored by G. K. Venkatesh
Films directed by T. S. Nagabharana